Southport is an unincorporated locale in Coos County, Oregon, United States. The former community is now a ghost town.

Location
The Southport town site is located on Southport Lane, off of US Highway 101, south of the city of Coos Bay in Coos County.

History
Sometime between 1875 and 1877 B. B. Jones opened a coal mine named the Southport Mine, and the village of Southport sprang up next to the mine.  It was a company town of the Black Diamond Coal Mining Company, headquartered in San Francisco, California. (Nortonville, California and Black Diamond, Washington, were two of the company's other towns.)

In 1882 the town had a population of 100, with a general merchandise store, a variety store, and a hotel/saloon.   A 2,000-foot-long makeshift railroad ran from the mine to the slough.

Southport never had a post office; instead it was served by the post office at Coos City (also now a ghost town), which was located on the other side of Isthmus Slough from Southport.

In 1885, the Black Diamond Coal Mining Company opened a new mine at Black Diamond, Washington, and many of the miners at Southport and Nortonville moved to the new mine.

In about 1885, the owners of a competing mine, the Newport Mine, leased the Southport Mine property but kept the mine closed.  This led to a decline of the town, although it was still shown on an 1896 USGS topographic map.

See also
Beaver Hill, Oregon

References

External links
 "History of Southport Land" (History of the Black Diamond Coal Mining Company of San Francisco). Retrieved 2014-03-15.
 "Coos County History" Retrieved 2014-03-15.
 "Geology and Coal Resources of the Coos Bay Quadrangle, Oregon" (Information on the Southport Mine). Retrieved 2014-03-15.
 "Southern Oregon. Resources of Coos and Douglas Counties: Timber, Coal and Agricultural Lands, 1882" (Information on the Southport Mine and the village of Southport). Retrieved 2014-03-15.

Coal towns in Oregon
Company towns in Oregon
Former populated places in Oregon
Geography of Coos County, Oregon
Ghost towns in Oregon